Afanasyev (masculine; Афанасьев) or Afanasyeva (feminine; Афанасьева) is a Russian last name. It is derived from  Afanasy which is etymologically directly connected to Athanasios (Αθανάσιος), a very common Greek masculine first name that means "immortal". As Russian last name it is shared by the following people:

People
Aleksey Afanasyev (1850-), Russian painter and illustrator
Alexander Afanasyev (1826–1871), Russian folklorist
Alexander Afanasyev-Chuzhbinsky (1817–1875), Russian/Ukrainian writer and ethnographer
Alexey Ivanovich Afanasyev (1910–1978), Soviet naval officer and Hero of the Soviet Union
Alexey Nikolayevich Afanasyev (1916–1968), Soviet army officer and Hero of the Soviet Union
Anatoly Afanasyev (1912–2003), Soviet army officer and Hero of the Soviet Union
Fyodor Afanasyev (1859–1905), Russian revolutionary
Georgy Afanasyev (1906–1975), Soviet geologist and petrographer
Mikhail Afanasyev (born 1986), Belarusian footballer
Ivan Afanasyev (1901–1952), Soviet naval officer and Hero of the Soviet Union
Ksenia Afanasyeva (born 1991), Russian olympic gymnast
Nikolay Fyodorovich Afanasyev (1918–1944), Soviet aircraft pilot and Hero of the Soviet Union
Nikolay Mikhaylovich Afanasyev (1916-2009), Russian firearms designer
Nikolay Nikolayevich Afanasyev (1893–1966), Russian Orthodox theologian
Nikolay Yakovlevich Afanasyev (1820–1898), Russian violinist and composer
Nina Afanasyeva (born 1939), Russian/Sami politician and language activist
Sergey Afanasyev (engineer) (1918–2001), Soviet engineer and space and defense industry executive
Sergey Afanasyev (athlete) (born 1964), Russian middle-distance runner
Sergey Afanasyev (racing driver) (born 1988), Russian racing driver
Stepan Afanasyev (1894–1965), Soviet party figure
Tatyana Afanasyeva (1876–1964), Russian/Dutch mathematician
Vahur Afanasjev (1979–2021), Estonian writer, filmmaker and musician
Valery Afanassiev (born 1947), Russian pianist
Valērijs Afanasjevs (born 1982), Latvian footballer
Vasily Afanasyev (1843–1913), prominent mechanical engineer of the Imperial Russian Navy
Viktor Grigoryevich Afanasyev (1922–1994), Soviet/Russian journalist
Viktor Mikhaylovich Afanasyev (born 1948), Soviet/Russian cosmonaut
Yegor Afanasyev, an alias of a Russian revolutionary Yegor Klimanov
Yelena Afanasyeva (athlete) (born 1967), Russian athlete
Yuri Afanasyev, (1934-2015), Russian historian and politician

Other
Afanasyeva (rural locality), a rural locality (a village) in Irkutsk Oblast, Russia

See also
Walter Afanasieff, Brazilian (of Russian descent) record producer and songwriter

References

Russian-language surnames

ru:Афанасьев